Neoclasico Isabelino is an architectural style that applies to houses and other buildings in Puerto Rico. These include a number of buildings in Ponce that are listed on the U.S. National Register of Historic Places:
Albergue Caritativo Tricoche
Antiguo Cuartel Militar Español de Ponce
Antiguo Hospital Militar Español de Ponce
Casa Alcaldía de Ponce-City Hall

Manuel V. Domenech, an architect from Isabela, Puerto Rico, was one of the architects who designed in this style, having designed, among others, the Puerto Rico Courthouse for the Ponce judicial district.

See also
 List of architectural styles
 Ponce Creole

References

External links
 Furniture in Puerto Rico, discussed the architectural style of furniture to accompany that of the building.

Architectural styles
Puerto Rican architecture